Climbing the Matterhorn is a 1947 American short documentary film directed by Irving Allen. It won an Oscar at the 20th Academy Awards in 1948 for Best Short Subject (Two-Reel).

See also
Timeline of climbing the Matterhorn

References

External links

1947 films
1947 short films
1947 documentary films
1940s short documentary films
American short documentary films
Black-and-white documentary films
Documentary films about climbing
Live Action Short Film Academy Award winners
Films set in the Alps
Matterhorn
Mountaineering films
American black-and-white films
1940s English-language films
1940s American films